Jamil Roberts can refer to:

Jamil Roberts (soccer, born 1986), American soccer midfielder
Jamil Roberts (footballer, born 1998), English football forward